The Boston Science-Fiction Film Festival hosted its 47th-anniversary festival in February of 2022, making it the 2nd oldest independent genre film festival in the US. The festival takes place each year in February, the week ending on President's Day  in the Greater Boston area and draws a dedicated crowd every year. It showcases over 100 science fiction features and short films, from all over the world. It culminates with a 24-hour movie marathon of classic, new, and schlock films.

History

Beginnings
The ‘Thon began back in 1976 at the Orson Welles Cinema in Cambridge, Massachusetts. It was designed to complement the Boskone, the Boston Science Fiction Convention, playing in Boston that same weekend. Sunday, February 15, 1976, was the inaugural program. It featured "This Island Earth", "The Day the Earth Stood Still", "The War of the Worlds", "Things to Come", "The Thing from Another World","Them!" and "Zardoz". Tickets for the 14 feature film event cost $4.75 with a complimentary champagne toast at the conclusion.

The following year featured a sneak preview of a then-unknown "Star Wars". Collectible posters were given out to attendees who paid the $4.95 admission price. By 1978, the event was given a tagline of SF3, connoting its third year. In a controversial decision, The ‘Thon’s 10th anniversary was a 36-hour endurance event. Additionally the Marathon programming has included a variety of short films, serialized dramas (such as the original Buck Rodgers), and cartoons such as the Warner Brothers classic Duck Dodgers in the 24½th Century.

End of the OWC era
A few months after SF11, the Orson Welles Cinema was destroyed by fire. The Marathon found a new home at the Somerville Theatre located in Davis Square, Somerville, Massachusetts which was under the operations of former Welles Manager, Garen Daly. Over the next few years, the event expanded to include more days, changed its official name to The Boston Science Fiction Film Festival, and became peripatetic. 

SF12 through SF14  were held at the Somerville Theatre in Somerville Massachusetts.

SF15 through SF28 were held at the Coolidge Corner Theatre in Brookline Massachusetts.

SF29 was held at the Dedham Community Theater in Dedham, Massachusetts.

SF30 returned to the Somerville Theatre and also had Friday Night and Sunday Night special events.

SF31 was held at the West Newton Cinema in West Newton, Massachusetts.

SF32 again returned to the Somerville Theatre, where it has been hosted annually to date, with the exception of SF46 which was held as a virtual event online due to the COVID-19 pandemic.

Growth and evolution
With the advent of VHS and DVD, the Festival faced changing tastes. To address these, it began to add more days, newer films, and more shorts reaching its current festival structure of ten days. The first nine days are devoted to showcasing new works from around the world. Judges rotate every year and are gleaned from the attendees, local personalities, and the occasional 'special' judge. Awards are presented every year for Best Feature and Best Short. In 2012, a new category was added, Steampunk Awards for this category also included Best Feature and Best Short. The marathon element is still the most popular part and most attended element of the festival.

Starting with SF36, the festival was expanded to a week-long event. The programming was expanded to attract newer films from around the world, especially from independent filmmakers. Typically the festival will present roughly 30 features, 75 shorts, 10 workshops and panels, and a number of party gatherings for filmmakers and attendees to connect. The festival continues to culminate with the 24-hour Marathon, where the programming is the same as it has been from its inception.

The Gort
The best overall film is awarded The Gort, a specially designed award named after the robot from the classic film The Day the Earth Stood Still. Quiet Earth exclaimed it is "probably the coolest looking award ever." It was designed by Boston sculptor Casey Riley after one of the first films in the inaugural program. The 2012 winner of the Gort was the film "Dimensions: A-Line, A Loop, A Tangle of Threads."

A new award was created in 2016 to recognize the best of the short films of the 220 + films annually submitted for review. The "thoners" are invited to vote for the best short film during the festival. The winner is announced and awarded The Short Gort during the 24 hour Marathon held on the Sunday preceding Presidents day each year.

SF47
SF47, the 2022 version of The Boston SciFi Film Festival was again held at the Somerville Theater, or (as it is become affectionately known) “The Starship Somerville.” Due to the Covid-19 Pandemic, the festival was a hybrid event, a combo live and virtual. The festival ran from February 16-22, 2022, culminating with the ‘Thon a 24-hour science fiction movie marathon, beginning at noon on Monday, Feb. 21st and ending at noon on Feb. 22nd. Festival submissions started in August and ran through the beginning of January. The Festival used WithoutABox as its submission agent. More information on submitting a film and the competition categories are available on the Festival’s website.

References

External links
 Home Page of the Boston Sci-Fi ‘Thon and Festival
 WithoutABox Filmmaker’s Entry Page
 Preview of the 35th Anniversary of the ‘Thon in the Boston Herald
 Fan Participation at the ‘Thon Explained for The Phoenix Readers
 Sister Sci-fi Marathon in Ohio
 Orson Welles Cinema Grand Opening
 Orson Welles Cinema Ad

History of Cambridge, Massachusetts
Film festivals in Boston
Science fiction film festivals